Tāddasa Lībān is an Ethiopian writer known for the collection Maskaram from 1956. Tāddasa Lībān's stories often involve life in Addis Ababa.

References

Ethiopian writers
Year of birth missing
Possibly living people
20th-century Ethiopian writers
Amharic-language writers